is a Japanese manga series written and illustrated by Kiwa Irie. It has been serialized in Kodansha's josei manga magazine Be Love since February 2018, with its chapters collected in eleven tankōbon volumes as of October 2022. In 2021, the manga won the 45th Kodansha Manga Award for the general category.

Publication
Kodansha has collected its chapters into individual tankōbon volumes. The first volume was released on July 13, 2018. As of September 13, 2022, eleven volumes have been released.

Volume list

Reception
On Takarajimasha's Kono Manga ga Sugoi! list of best manga of 2019 for female readers, the series ranked 16th (alongside Dokushin OL no Subete and Lullaby for Girl); it ranked 8th (alongside Hadaka Ikkan! Tsuzui-san) on the 2020 list; and 11th on the 2022 list. The manga won the 45th Kodansha Manga Award for the general category in 2021. It has been nominated for the 27th Tezuka Osamu Cultural Prize in 2023.

References

Further reading

External links
 

Drama anime and manga
Josei manga
Kodansha manga
Winner of Kodansha Manga Award (General)